Andrew McBride may refer to:

 Andrew McBride (footballer) (born 1954), English footballer
 Andrew McBride (lacrosse) (born 1982), Canadian box lacrosse player
 Andrew F. McBride (1869–1946), physician and mayor of Paterson, New Jersey
 Andrew G. McBride (born 1960), American attorney